The 1932–33 Montreal Canadiens season was the team's 24th season. The Canadiens again qualified for the playoffs, finishing third in their division. The club again met and lost to the New York Rangers in the playoffs.

The summer led to changes in the Canadiens organization. First, a change occurred in the team ownership. Louis Letourneau,  regarded as a positive influence on the team, "generous in his praise and encouragement" sold his interest in the Canadiens to his partners Leo Dandurand and Joe Cattarinich.

After the disappointing 1931–32 season, Cecil Hart faced pressure from fans to resign his position in favour of a French-Canadian. When Hart, an independent insurance broker, had signed on as coach, the season was four and a half months and 36 games. Now it was 48 games and seven months. A combination of the pressure, and the negative effects on his business, led him to resign in August 1932. Former Canadiens star Newsy Lalonde would take over as coach.

Regular season
Economic conditions in Montreal, part of the Great Depression caused attendance to decline. Over 40,000 families and 150,000 individuals were receiving social assistance. The team would lose $20,000 dollars on the season.

On the ice, the Canadiens under new coach Lalonde spent much of the season in last place, but managed to make the playoffs when they rallied to finish third. Howie Morenz, who had previously led the league in scoring, declined in production, and Aurel Joliat took over as the team leader in scoring.

Final standings

Record vs. opponents

Schedule and results

Playoffs
In the first round the Canadiens met the New York Rangers, who had placed third in the American Division. The Canadiens lost the two-games total-goals series 8–5.

 New York Rangers vs. Montreal Canadiens

Player statistics

Regular season
Scoring

Goaltending

Playoffs
Scoring

Goaltending

Transactions
 February 14, 1933. – Marty Burke was traded to Ottawa by Montreal with future considerations (Nick Wasnie, March 23, 1933) for Leo Bourgeault and Harold Starr.
 March 23, 1933 – Marty Burke was traded to Montreal by Ottawa for Nick Wasnie.

See also
1932–33 NHL season

References

Notes

Montreal Canadiens seasons
Montreal Canadiens
Montreal Canadiens